Étienne Maynon d'Invault (born 1721, Paris – 1801, Saint-Germain-en-Laye) was a French statesman.

Life
Son of Vincent Maynon of Invault and Agnes Bouvard Fourqueux, in 1758 he married his cousin Elizabeth Adelaide Bouvard Fourqueux.

He was advisor to the Investigations of the Parliament of Paris in 1741. He was then master of requests (4 March 1747 - 29 January 1766), president of the Grand Council (1753), steward of Picardy in Amiens (August 1754). Appointed State supernumerary on 5 October 1766, he became Counselor of State on 7 November 1767.

He was appointed Comptroller General of Finance on 22 September 1768 and Minister of State on 10 December 1768.

He proposed extending the second Vingtième until 1772, which raised strong remonstrances of the Parliaments and drove Louis XV to hold a lit de justice on 11 January 1769 to register the edict.

He used the ordinary expedients, while preparing drastic measures that should be discussed on 19 December 1769. The Boards of Finance gathered together, in a committee comprising members of both Councils. 
Following this meeting, Louis XV decided not to submit the measures envisaged in the expanded Council, which led to his resignation on 19 December 1769.

References

1721 births
1801 deaths
Politicians from Paris
French Ministers of Finance